The Singapore Gaelic Lions is a Gaelic football club in Singapore. It is established in 1997 and considered one of the strongest Gaelic football clubs in Southeast Asia.

The club won the Bill Nikolopoulos Cup 2009.
The club participated in the 2008 Asian Gaelic Games held in Penang, Malaysia.
The club won the 2nd KL Challenge Trophy organised by Orang Eire.

The club hosted the 12th Asian Games in 2007, with clubs from across the continent competing to become Asian Champions.

Record
SEA Gaelic Games
 2008 - Champions
 2009 - Champions
 2010 - Champions
 2011 - Champions

Notable players

Senior inter-county ladies' footballers
 Dublin
 Rachel Ruddy

References

External links
 Official website
 WFN International Rules Ladies Ireland to play Australia in 2006

1997 establishments in Singapore
Gaelic games clubs by location
Gaelic Athletic Association clubs established in 1997
Gaelic games in Asia
Sports teams in Singapore